Fort Point may refer to:

 Fort Point, Boston, Massachusetts
 Fort Point, Newfoundland and Labrador, Canada
 Fort Point, San Francisco, California
 Fort Point (Greenwich Island), Antarctica